Soontaga Nature Reserve is a nature reserve which is located in Valga County, Estonia.

The protected area was founded in 2006 to protect valuable habitat types and threatened species in Soontaga village (former Puka Parish).

References

Nature reserves in Estonia
Geography of Valga County